The Terrible Trio is a supervillain team appearing in American comic books published by Marvel Comics.

Publication history 
Created by Stan Lee and Jack Kirby, they first appeared in Fantastic Four #23 (1964). They made several appearances in the 1960s and then one appearance in the late 1970s in Marvel Two-in-One #60.

Fictional team history
Bull Brogin, "Handsome" Harry Phillips, and Yogi Dakor were three career criminals brought together by Doctor Doom to help him destroy the Fantastic Four. He pays their bail using a robot and gives each of them superpowers, multiplying their natural abilities by a dozen. The trio capture the Fantastic Four, Phillips tracks the Invisible Girl and gases her, Dakor pretends to be delivering a car to the Torch from a Maharaja, but reveals it is fireproof when he traps him inside and fills it with gas, and Bull uses a cosmic ray gun from Doom to briefly turn the Thing to Ben Grimm and knocks him out. Doom captures Mr Fantastic using a robot Thing which helps him imprison Mr Fantastic in a glass box. Doom sends the Trio them to another dimension until he again needs their services. The Fantastic Four, however, defeated Doom, sending him into space, and the trio was returned to Earth as the power needed to keep them was lessened.

The trio faced the Human Torch two times after that. Both times they captured him but he was able to escape, the first time he was caught with an asbestos lasso and left in Yogi's fireproof trailer, but he generated so much smoke the Fire Brigade came and freed him, after which he got back to his house and defeated the Trio, who were waiting for the Invisible Girl, and when Harry tried to escape in the Torch's car, he was captured. The second time they were beaten with the help of the Thing after the Torch was knocked out and left on a traintrack, the Thing knocked the train back with his legs and defeated the off-guard Trio, who were planning on attacking Mr Fantastic. They were then tied up and taken back to prison.

The trio then spent the better part of a decade in prison before Dakor gained the ability to project their minds into inanimate objects. They possessed Alicia Masters' statues and battled the Thing, he was initially unwilling to damage the statues until Alicia told him it was fine, who defeated them with the help of the Impossible Man.

Years later and allied with Latverian terrorists, the Terrible Trio were apphrended by the Thunderbolts during an arms deal. The trio were badly beaten by Thunderbolt's member Penance, and arrested for being in violation of the Superhuman Registration Act.

Powers and abilities
Each of the Terrible Trio has different powers:
 Brogin has strength twelve times a normal man.
 Phillips has increased hearing.
 Dakor is completely fireproof and has other lesser abilities. He sometimes rides a mechanical flying carpet. In one story he shows a skill for snake conducting. Dakor later develops the ability to possess inanimate objects, a power he can share with Brogin and Phillips.

The trio employ an asbestos blanket and rope against the Human Torch.

References
 Christiansen, Jeff et al. Marvel Legacy: The 1960s Handbook. Marvel Comics, 2006.
 Olshevsky, George The Official Marvel Index to the Fantastic Four Volume 2, Issue 2. Marvel Comics, 1986.

External links
 
 
Fictional organizations in Marvel Comics
Marvel Comics supervillain teams
Characters created by Stan Lee
Characters created by Jack Kirby
Fictional trios